Georgetown FC is a Guyanese football club based in Georgetown, competing in the GFF Elite League, the top tier of Guyanese football.

Its home ground is across the road from the Guyana Zoo and Botanical Gardens.

History
Founded in 1902, Georgetown FC is the oldest club in Guyana. In 2015, Georgetown became an inaugural member of the GFF Elite League.

References

Football clubs in Guyana
1902 establishments in British Guiana